The Praia d'El Rey European Cup was an annual professional golf tournament played at Praia d'El Rey, Portugal. It was played in 1997, 1998 and 1999 between teams of men representing the European Seniors Tour and ladies representing the Ladies European Tour. There was no handicap but the men and women played off different tees.

The men won the first event 13–7 in 1997 and retained the cup in 1998 after a 10–10 tie. The ladies won the final event 11–9 in 1999. Tommy Horton and  Marie-Laure de Lorenzi were the captains on each occasion.

Results

Appearances
The following are those who played in at least one of the three matches.

European Seniors Tour
  Maurice Bembridge 1997
  Bill Brask 1999
  Jerry Bruner 1999
  José María Cañizares 1997
  Neil Coles 1998, 1999
  David Creamer 1997
  Antonio Garrido 1997, 1999
  Malcolm Gregson 1997
  Tommy Horton 1997, 1998, 1999
  Brian Huggett 1998
  David Jones 1998, 1999
  Ross Metherell 1999
  John Morgan 1997, 1999
  Christy O'Connor Jnr 1998
  Denis O'Sullivan 1998
  Eddie Polland 1998, 1999
  Noel Ratcliffe 1997
  Jim Rhodes 1997, 1998
  Alan Tapie 1999
  Bobby Verwey 1998
  Brian Waites 1997, 1998

Ladies European Tour
  Raquel Carriedo 1999
  Laura Davies 1999
  Marie-Laure de Lorenzi 1997, 1998, 1999
  Lora Fairclough 1998, 1999
  Sofia Grönberg-Whitmore 1999
  Sophie Gustafson 1998, 1999
  Maria Hjorth 1997, 1998, 1999
  Trish Johnson 1997, 1998, 1999
  Karen Lunn 1997, 1998
  Laurette Maritz 1997
  Kathryn Marshall 1997
  Catriona Matthew 1998
  Mhairi McKay 1998
  Sandrine Mendiburu 1999
  Patricia Meunier-Lebouc 1997
  Joanne Morley 1997
  Alison Nicholas 1997, 1998, 1999
  Catrin Nilsmark 1998
  Shani Waugh 1997

References

Former European Senior Tour events
Team golf tournaments
Golf tournaments in Portugal